Kevlin may refer to:

 Kevlin Henney, author, presenter, and consultant on software development, active 2001–present
 25118 Kevlin, minor planet

See also 
 Kelvin